Domenico Allegri (c. 1585 – 5 September 1629) was an Italian composer and singer of the early Baroque Roman School. He was the second son of the Milanese coachman Costantino Allegri, who lived in Rome with his family, and was a younger brother of the more famous Gregorio Allegri. Costantino sent three sons, Gregorio, Domenico and Bartolomeo, to study music at San Luigi dei Francesi, under the maestro di capella Giovanni Bernardino Nanino, brother of Giovanni Maria Nanino. The little boy had as schoolmate his elder brother Gregorio and then Antonio Cifra, Domenico Massenzio and Paolo Agostini.

In 1606, Allegri was maestro di cappella of the church of Santa Maria at Spello, and from September 1609 until April 1610 served in the same role at the church of Santa Maria in Trastevere in Rome. From 3 April 1610 until his death, he held the same position at the Basilica di Santa Maria Maggiore, where he was buried.

Allegri is mainly famous as being one of the first to include specific instrumental accompaniments to sacred vocal music on a small scale. While much of his music is lost, one piece which has survived is the Modi quos expositis in choris of 1617 which has accompaniments to the voices by two violins.

References

Bibliography
Alberto Cametti, La scuola dei «pueri cantus» di S. Luigi dei francesi in Roma e i suoi principali allievi (1591-1623): Gregorio, Domenico e Bartolomeo Allegri, Antonio Cifra, Orazio Benevoli, Torino, Fratelli Bocca, 1915.
Sergio Durante, 'Domenico Allegri', in Dizionario enciclopedico universale della musica e dei musicisti, Torino, UTET, 1983–1999, .
Saverio Franchi, Annali della stampa musicale romana dei secoli XVI-XVIII, Vol. 1/I, IBIMUS, Roma, 2006, .
Antonella Nigro, Domenico Massenzio. A new biography with unpublished documents, in Domenico Massenzio Opera omnia, Critical Edition by Claudio Dall'Albero e Mauro Bacherini, Vol. 1, Milano, Rugginenti, 2008, ISMN M-52013-013-4.
Alberto Pironti, 'Domenico Allegri', in Dizionario Biografico degli Italiani, Roma, Treccani.
Colin Timms, 'Domenico Allegri', in New Grove Dictionary, .

Italian Baroque composers
Italian male classical composers
Italian male singers
Singers from Rome
1580s births
1629 deaths
Roman school composers
17th-century Italian composers
17th-century male musicians